St Nicholas Church, Sutton, is a Grade II* listed parish church in the centre of Sutton, London. It was built between 1862 and 1864 in the Gothic style with dressed flint and stone dressings. It was designed by the architect Edwin Nash.

Location
St Nicholas - the oldest of the three town centre churches in Sutton - is surrounded by a small ancient graveyard, which is wooded. It also contains some lawned areas with benches. Two well used public footpaths run through these grounds. It is in ecumenical partnership with other denominations and in a Team Ministry with other Anglican churches.

History
The present building stands on a site that has been used as a church since Saxon times - an earlier, smaller church occupied the site until the nineteenth century, which apart from its piscina was replaced by the present church building, which was consecrated in February 1864. The previous church was stone, and dated mostly from the fourteenth or fifteenth centuries. It had a tower, porch and chancel. Its poor condition, as well as the enlargement of its congregation, necessitated its replacement.

The church suffered slight damage in an air raid in 1940, during the London Blitz. A flying bomb fell near the church and mostly destroyed some of the graves in the churchyard, but the building itself remained largely intact.

Architectural features

The church was rebuilt from an earlier one in 1862-4 by Edwin Nash, incorporating monuments from the old building. It is in the Gothic style. It was constructed with dressed flint and stone dressings. Its roof is of red tile. The entrance is bright blue. It has a four-bay nave, chancel, organ chamber and vestry, side aisles, south aisle chapel and west tower. Its tower has a doorway in its west side, four tiers of fenestration and a shingled broach spire. There are aisle windows of three lights with circular tracery over in pointed heads, two-light windows to the south aisle chapel and a chancel window of five lights. There are gabled porches to the north and south sides; the south porch has the following inscription on its bargeboard: "How amiable are thy dwellings thou Lord of Hosts". Inside the church are a nave with pointed arches supported on circular columns with foliated capitals; timber roofs; and whitewashed walls. The present structure incorporates a medieval piscina and monuments from the old church including the following: monuments to Sarah Glover 1628, to Lady Dorothy Brownlow 1699, to William Earl Talbot 1782 and to Isaac Littlebury 1740.

Burials
 Dorothy Mason, wife of Sir William Brownlow, 4th Baronet (d. 1700)
 William Talbot, 1st Earl Talbot (1710–1782)

Notable clergy
 Joseph Glover (d. 1638), who owned a printing business and whose wife, Elizabeth Glover, introduced the printing press to North America, was Rector of St Nicholas from 1624 to 1636.

References

Sutton, London
Sutton
Sutton
Grade II* listed churches in London
Grade II* listed buildings in the London Borough of Sutton
Churches completed in 1864
Rebuilt churches in the United Kingdom
19th-century Church of England church buildings
Churches bombed by the Luftwaffe in London